Hypogymnia congesta is a rare species of foliose lichen in the family Parmeliaceae that is found in China. It was formally described as a new species by Bruce McCune and Chicita Culberson in 2003. There it grows on the bark and wood of conifers and bamboo. Its ascospores measure 7–8 by 5.0–5.5 μm. The lichen is chemically distinct, containing virensic acid and physodic acid, but lacking physodalic acid. Virensic acid is otherwise unknown from the genus Hypogymnia.

References

congesta
Lichen species
Fungi of China
Lichens described in 2003
Taxa named by Bruce McCune
Taxa named by Chicita F. Culberson